The 2010–11 UAE Pro League season (known as Etisalat Pro League for sponsorship reasons) was the 36th edition of top-level football in the United Arab Emirates. This was the third Professional season in the history of the country. Al-Wahda were defending champions from the 2009–10 campaign. Ajman Club and Emirates Club were relegated from the previous season. Dubai Club and Al-Ittihad were promoted from the UAE Division 1 Group A. The campaign began on 26 August 2010 and ended on 9 June 2011.

After being runner-up for three times in a row Al Jazira secured their 1st Pro League title after beating Al Wasl 4–0 on 16 May 2011. Becoming the 3rd club to achieve the Double in country history after Al Nasr in 1986 and Al Wasl in 2007.

Teams
Ajman Club and Emirates Club were relegated to the second-level league after finishing in the bottom two in the 2009–10 season. The two relegated teams were replaced by 2nd level champions Al-Ittihad Kalba and runners up Dubai Club.

Stadia and locations

Personnel and sponsorship

Note: Flags indicate national team as has been defined under FIFA eligibility rules. Players and Managers may hold more than one non-FIFA nationality.

Managerial changes

Pre-season

During the season

League table

Results

Season statistics

Top goalscorers

Source: Etisalat Pro-League – Top goalscorersLast updated:2 June 2011

Scoring
First goal of the season:  Abass Lawal for Al Dhafra against Al Ahli, 35 minutes and 19 seconds (27 August 2010).
First penalty kick of the season: 56 minutes and 44 seconds –  Marcelinho (scored) for Al Sharjah against Al Jazira (2 September 2010).
Fastest goal in a match: 2 minutes –  Hugo for Al Wahda against Al Shabab (27 October 2010).
Goal scored at the latest point in a match: 94 minutes and 47 seconds –  Jumaa Abdullah for Al Jazira against Al Wasl (16 May 2011).
Widest winning margin: 6 Goals
Al Wahda 6–1 Al Sharjah (15 May 2011).
Dubai 6–4 Al Dhafra (20 May 2011).
Most goals in a match by one team: 6 Goals
Al Wahda 6–1 Al Sharjah (15 May 2011).
Dubai 6–4 Al Dhafra (20 May 2011).
Most goals scored by losing team: 4 goals
Dubai 6–4 Al Dhafra (20 May 2011).
Most goals in a match by one player: 3 goals
 André Senghor for Bani Yas against Ittihad Kalba (26 September 2010)
 Boris Kabi for Al Dhafra against Al Wahda (23 December 2010)
 Ismail Matar for Al Wahda against Ittihad Kalba (19 February 2011)
Hat-tricks of the season:
 André Senghor for Bani Yas against Ittihad Kalba (26 September 2010)
 Boris Kabi for Al Dhafra against Al Wahda (23 December 2010)
 Ismail Matar for Al Wahda against Ittihad Kalba (19 February 2011)

Discipline
First yellow card of the season:  Fabio Cannavaro for Al Ahli against Al Dhafra, 9 minutes (27 August 2010).
First red card of the season:  Darwish Ahmed for Al Wasl against Al Ahli, 90 minutes (1 September 2010).
Card given at latest point in a game:
 Abdallah Ahmed (yellow) at 90+3 for Al Nasr against Al Dhafra (28 May 2011).

Source: Yellow Cards, Red CardsLast updated: 2 June 2011

Average attendance
Source:

 Al-Jazira 15,922
 Al-Wasl 3,240
 Al-Ain FC 4,950
 Al Wahda FC 3,608
 Al-Ahli 2,513
 Baniyas 2,317
 Al-Nasr 1,703
 Al-Shabab 1,065
 Sharjah 1,501
 Al-Dhafra 802
 Dubai CSC 900
 Kalba 659

See also
 2010–11 UAE President's Cup
 2010–11 Etisalat Emirates Cup

References

External links
 UFL Official Website
 Football Association The UAE Football Association

UAE Pro League seasons
United
1